= Winchester Cathedral (Lawrence Welk album) =

Studio album by Lawrence Welk and His Orchestra
- Released: 1966
- Genre: Easy listening
- Label: Dot

Winchester Cathedral is an album by Lawrence Welk and His Orchestra. It was released in 1966 on the Dot label (catalog no. DLP-25774).

The album debuted on Billboard magazine's popular albums chart on December 31, 1966, reached the No. 12 spot, and remained on that chart for 18 weeks. It was certified as a gold record by the RIAA.

== Track listing ==
Side 1

1. "Winchester Cathedral" (vocals by Bob Lido, written by Geoff Stephens) [2:16]
2. "Born Free" (Black, Barry) [2:24]
3. "Summer Wind" (Bradtke, Mayer, Mercer) [2:20]
4. "Family Affair" (Theme From "Family Affair") (Frank De Vol) [1:53]
5. "Mas Que Nada (Pow-Pow-Pow)" (Ben, Deane) [2:35]

Side 2

1. "Summer Samba" (M. Valle, N. Gimbel, P. Valle) [2:08]
2. "Tijuana" (Cates, Douglas) [2:00]
3. "Cuando" (George Cates) [2:12]
4. "Copy Cat" (Quincy Jones) [2:00]
5. "Walking On New Grass" (Ray Pennington) [2:24]
